Sir John Neeld, 1st Baronet (1805–1891) was Member of Parliament for Cricklade between 1835 and 1859, and Chippenham, Wiltshire, England between 1865 and 1868.

Early life and career 
Neeld was one of five sons of Joseph Neeld (1754–1828) and his wife Mary (née Bond) (1765–1857), of Hendon, Middlesex. He was educated at Harrow School and Trinity College, Cambridge, where he took a B.A. in 1827 and an M.A. three years later.

In 1840 he was a founder member of the Conservative Club and in 1845 married Lady Eliza Harriet Dickson, setting up home in London. The same year he was appointed to the office of Gentleman of the Privy Chamber to Queen Victoria, for which service he was created 1st Baronet Neeld and became entitled to the style "Sir John Neeld" on 20 April 1859.

In 1852 he was offered the position of Junior Lord of the Treasury by Lord Derby, but refused.

Neeld became a major landowner in Wiltshire, having inherited from his brother Joseph in 1856; in 1872 he was High Sheriff of the county.

Death and legacy
Neeld died on 3 September 1891 at Grittleton House, Wiltshire.

His son Algernon William (11 June 1846 – 11 August 1900) inherited the baronetcy; on his death his son, Audley Dallas Neeld, became the 3rd Baronet and inherited Rembrandt's self-portrait of 1669, today in the Mauritshuis. On the Audley's death on 1 May 1941 the title was extinguished.

John Neeld's daughter Ada Mary (b. 11 June 1846), twin sister of Algernon, married General Sir George Harry Smith Willis, a British Army General who achieved high office in the 1880s, and they went on to have four sons. Lady Ada Mary Willis (née Neeld) opened the Southsea Railway on 1 July 1885, as her husband was the Lieutenant Governor of Portsmouth at the time.

See also 
 Neeld baronets

References

External links 
 

Baronets in the Baronetage of the United Kingdom
1805 births
1891 deaths
Conservative Party (UK) MPs for English constituencies
UK MPs 1835–1837
UK MPs 1837–1841
UK MPs 1841–1847
UK MPs 1847–1852
UK MPs 1852–1857
UK MPs 1857–1859
UK MPs 1865–1868
People educated at Harrow School
Alumni of Trinity College, Cambridge
High Sheriffs of Wiltshire
Members of the Parliament of the United Kingdom for Cricklade
Members of the Parliament of the United Kingdom for Chippenham